Spiegelau is a municipality in the district of Freyung-Grafenau in Bavaria in Germany. It lies in the heart of the Bavarian Forest.

Subdivisions 
There are 33 villages in the municipality:

There are also the Gemarkungen of Spiegelau, Oberkreuzberg and Klingenbrunn.

Transport
Spiegelau lies on Zwiesel–Grafenau railway and its station was formerly the junction to the Spiegelau Forest Railway which supporting the major logging industry in the area.

See also
Bavarian Forest National Park

References

Freyung-Grafenau